Adem Zorgane (born 6 January 2000) is an Algerian professional footballer who plays for Charleroi and the Algeria national team. He is the son of former Algeria international Malik Zorgane.

Club career

Paradou AC
On 13 August 2018 Zorgane made his senior debut for Paradou AC, becoming the first ever player born in the 21st century to play in the Algerian Ligue Professionnelle 1.

Charleroi
On 27 June 2021 Zorgane signed a four-year contract with Belgian First Division A club Charleroi. He made his debut for the club in the Belgian First Division A on 8 August, scoring his first goal in the eighth minute of a 1–1 draw against OH Leuven. In his first season with Charleroi, Zorgane quickly established himself as a starter, making 37 total appearances in which he scored three goals.

International career
In the summer of 2018, Zorgane was part of Algeria's under-18 national team at the 2018 Mediterranean Games in Tarragona, Spain.

Career statistics

Club

References

External links
 
 NFT Profile

2000 births
Living people
Algerian footballers
Algerian expatriate footballers
Algeria international footballers
Algeria under-23 international footballers
Algerian Ligue Professionnelle 1 players
Belgian Pro League players
ES Sétif players
Paradou AC players
R. Charleroi S.C. players
People from Sétif
Association football midfielders
21st-century Algerian people
Expatriate footballers in Belgium
Algerian expatriate sportspeople in Belgium